Brownsville may refer to:

United States
Brownsville, Alabama, unincorporated community in Clay County
Brownsville, California (disambiguation), the name of several places
Brownsville, Delaware
Brownsville, Florida
Brownsville (Metrorail station), located at the above location
Brownsville, Escambia County, Florida
Brownsville, the original name of the South Atlanta neighborhood of Atlanta, Georgia
Brownsville, Georgia, an unincorporated community in Paulding County
Brownsville (ghost town), Illinois, ghost town in Jackson County, Illinois
Brownsville, White County, Illinois, unincorporated community in White County, Illinois
Brownsville, Indiana
Brownsville, Kentucky
Brownsville-Bawcomville, Louisiana
Brownsville, Maryland
Brownsville, Minnesota
Brownsville, Mississippi, in Hinds County, Mississippi
Brownsville, Brooklyn, New York
Brownsville, Ohio
Brownsville, Oregon
Brownsville, Pennsylvania
Brownsville, Berks County, Pennsylvania
Brownsville Township, Fayette County, Pennsylvania
Brownsville, South Dakota
Brownsville, Tennessee
Brownsville, Texas, largest population among cities with this name
Brownsville, Vermont
Brownsville (Nassawadox, Virginia), a historic house
Brownsville, Washington
Brownsville, West Virginia
Brownsville, Wisconsin

Canada
Brownsville, British Columbia
Brownsville, Nova Scotia
Brownsville, Durham Region, Ontario
Brownsville, Oxford County, Ontario
Brownsville Station, Ontario
The original name of Schomberg, Ontario
An early settlement of Woodbridge, Ontario, founded between 1802 and 1837, now subsumed by Woodbridge

Australia
Brownsville, New South Wales, a suburb of Wollongong, New South Wales

See also
 Brownsville affair
 Brownville (disambiguation)
 "Brownsville Girl" (1986 song)